Year 1271 (MCCLXXI) was a common year starting on Thursday (link will display the full calendar) of the Julian calendar.

Events 
 By place 

 Europe 
 July 2 – Peace of Pressburg: Kings Ottokar II and Stephen V sign a peace agreement at Pressburg, settling territorial claims, following the failed invasion of Hungary by Ottokar in April. In the agreement, Stephen promises not to support Ottokar's opponents in Carinthia, and Ottokar renounces the castles he and his partisans occupy in Hungary. 
 The 17-year-old Marco Polo departs from Venice, with his father and uncle Niccolò and Maffeo Polo, to set off for Asia, to meet Mongolian emperor Kublai Khan (grandson of Genghis Khan), at his court in Beijing, China. They sail across the Mediterranean Sea and travel overland, crossing Armenia, Persia, and the Pamir Mountains.
 August 21 – The counties of Poitou and Toulouse are absorbed into the French domains following the death of Alphonse of Poitiers, son of the late King Louis VIII (the Lion).
 Construction of the Tower of Kamyenyets (or the White Tower) in Belarus begins. Later, it becomes a frontier stronghold on the northern border of Volhynia.

 Levant 
 February – Mamluk forces led by Sultan Baibars continue their territorial expansion in western Syria and appear before Safita Castle (called the White Castle) built by the Knights Templar. After a heroic defense, the small garrison is advised by Grand Master Thomas Bérard to surrender. The survivors are allowed to withdraw to Tortosa.
 April 8 – Siege of Krak des Chevaliers: Mamluk forces under Baibars capture the strategically important castle Krak des Chevaliers from the Knights Hospitaller. During the siege the defenders receive a letter, supposedly from Grand Master Hugues de Revel, to surrender the castle. Under safe-conduct the Hospitallers retreat to Tripoli.
 May–June – Baibars conducts an unsuccessful siege of Tripoli, and also fails in an attempted naval invasion of Cyprus. He sends an Egyptian fleet (some 20 ships) to Limassol, while King Hugh III (the Great) has left for Acre. Due to bad weather and seamanship, 11 ships run aground and the crews fall into the hands of the Cypriots.
 May 9 – Prince Edward (the Lord Edward) and King Charles I of Anjou arrive in Acre, with a fleet of 30 galleys, starting the Ninth Crusade against Baibars. During the Crusade they are unable to capture any territory and peace is quickly negotiated with the Mamluk Sultanate. Baibars consolidates his occupation in Syria.
 October – Abaqa Khan, Mongol ruler of the Ilkhanate, detaches some 10,000 horsemen from Anatolia to support Edward I (the Lord Edward) in his war against Baibars. They invade Syria and defeat Mamluk forces who protect the region around Aleppo. The Mongols plunder the cities of Maarat al-Numan and Apamea.

 Asia 
 September 12 – Nichiren, Japanese Buddhist priest, is arrested by a band of soldiers and nearly beheaded. This incident, known as Hosshaku Kenpon or "casting off the transient and revealing the true," is regarded as a turning point of Nichiren's teachings within the various schools, known as Nichiren Buddhism.
 December 18 – Kublai Khan renames his empire "Great Yuan" (大元; dà yuán), officially marking the start of the Yuan Dynasty in China.
 The Nakhi Kingdom, of the northern Himalayan foothills, is annexed by the Yuan Dynasty (approximate date). 

 By topic 

 Religion 
 September 1 – Pope Gregory X succeeds late Clement IV as the 184th pope of the Catholic Church, as the compromise candidate between French and Italian cardinals, ending a three-year conclave, the longest ever.

Births 
 March 13 – Judith of Habsburg, queen of Bohemia (d. 1297)
 March 14 – Stephen I, German nobleman and regent (d. 1310)
 May 25 – Shah Jalal, Indian Sufi leader and mystic (d. 1346)
 June 20 – John de Ferrers, English nobleman (d. 1312)
 September 8 – Charles Martel, king of Hungary (d. 1295)
 September 27 – Wenceslaus II, king of Poland (d. 1305)
 November 2 – Gong of Song, Chinese emperor (d. 1323)
 November 5 – Mahmud Ghazan, Mongol ruler (d. 1304)
 Awhadi Maraghai, Persian poet and mystic (d. 1338)
 Blanche of Brittany, French noblewoman (d. 1327)
 Cheng Duanli, Chinese scholar and poet (d. 1345)
 Cormac MacCarthy Mor, king of Desmond (d. 1359)
 Eifuku Mon'in, Japanese empress consort (d. 1342)
 Elizabeth of Aragon, queen of Portugal (d. 1336)
 Gerlach I, German nobleman and knight (d. 1361)
 Maurice de Berkeley, English nobleman (d. 1326)
 Mikhail Yaroslavich, Kievan Grand Prince (d. 1318)
 Nijō Tamemichi, Japanese poet and writer (d. 1299)
 Sargis II, Georgian nobleman and prince (d. 1334)
 Sunbi Heo, wife of Chungseon of Goryeo (d. 1335)

Deaths 
 January 17 – Joan of Chiny, French noblewoman (b. 1205)
 January 28 – Isabella of Aragon, queen of France (b. 1248)
 February 9 – Beatrix of Merania, German princess (b. 1210)
 March 13 – Henry of Cornwall, English nobleman (b. 1235)
 March 21 – Ibn Sab'in, Andalusian philosopher and mystic
 April 17 – Isabella of France, queen of Navarre (b. 1241)
 July 1 – Bartholomew of Braganca, Italian friar and bishop 
 July 28 – Walter de Burgh (or Bourke), Norman nobleman 
 August 21 – Alphonse, son of Louis VIII (the Lion) (b. 1220)
 August 25 – Joan of Toulouse, French noblewoman (b. 1220)
 September 1 – Annibaldo degli Annibaldi, Italian theologian
 September 9 – Yaroslav III, Kievan Grand Prince (b. 1230)
 October 17 – Steinvör Sighvatsdóttir, Icelandic female poet
 October 19 – Philip Basset, English chief justiciar (b. 1185)
 Al-Mansur al-Hasan, Yemeni imam and politician (b. 1199)
 Arnaldo de Peralta, Aragonese archbishop and statesman
 Constantine Palaiologos, Byzantine nobleman and co-ruler
 Ghiyas-ud-din Baraq, Mongol ruler of the Chagatai Khanate
 Haji Bektash Veli, Persian philosopher and mystic (b. 1209)
 Henry of Segusio, Italian jurist and cardinal-bishop (b. 1200)
 Lauretta of Saarbrücken, German noblewoman and regent
 Maria of Chernigov, Kievan princess and regent (b. 1212)
 Richard de Grey, English nobleman, constable and knight
 Roger de Leybourne, English nobleman and High Sheriff
 Stephen the Posthumous, Hungarian pretender (b. 1236)
 Vardan Areveltsi, Armenian historian and writer (b. 1198)

References